Samoa, officially the Independent State of Samoa, has a population of approximately 188,000 people. Samoa gained independence from New Zealand in 1962 and has a Westminster model of Parliamentary democracy which incorporates aspects of traditional practices. In 2016, Samoa ratified the Convention on the Rights of Persons with Disabilities CRPD and the three optional protocols to the CRC 

While the Constitution of the Independent State of Samoa provides for the protection of certain fundamental human rights, there continue to be several major issues. Major areas of concern include the under-representation of women, domestic violence and poor prison conditions. 
Reports issued under the auspices of the United Nations have noted that societal attitudes towards human rights tend to be skeptical, this is attributed to concern that that enforcement of such rights will be at the detriment of Samoan customs and tradition. Another point of concern is gay rights in the country as homosexuality is illegal.

International treaty obligations
Samoa is a member of the United Nations and has also ratified the Convention on the Elimination of all Forms of Discrimination Against Women (CEDAW), the Convention on the Rights of the Child (CRC), the International Covenant on Civil and Political Rights (ICCPR), the Rome Statute of the International Criminal Court (ICC) and the eight fundamental conventions of the International Labour Organization (ILO). In 2012 Samoa ratified the International Convention for the Protection of All Persons from Enforced Disappearance (CPPED).

Due to limited resources, Samoa has previously failed to issue reports within the designated time frames of the conventions. For example, Samoa submitted its initial, second and third periodic reports under CEDAW as one document in May 2003 when they were due in 1993, 1997 and 2001 respectively.

Concern has been expressed in regard to Samoa's limited incorporation of treaty obligations into its national law. For example, in 2005 CEDAW voiced concern over the lack of a time frame for reform of domestic legislation in conformity with the convention.

In response to recommendations, Samoa issued a standing invitation to all United Nations Special Procedures Mandate Holders in 2011.

Constitutional protection
The Constitution of the Independent State of Samoa 1960 came into force in 1962 and provides for the protection of fundamental human rights such as:
Right to life (section 5)
Right to personal liberty (section 6)
Freedom from inhuman treatment (section 7)
Freedom from forced labour (section 8)
Right to fair trial and due process (sections 9,10)
Freedom of religion (sections 11,12)
Rights regarding freedom of speech, assembly, association, movement and residence (section 13)
Property rights (section 14)
Freedom from discriminatory legislation (section 15)
While freedom from discrimination is provided for in regards to descent, sex, language, religion, political or other opinion, social origin, place of birth and family status there is no protection from discrimination on the basis of disability or sexual orientation.

A noteworthy omission from the constitution is the right to be free from torture.

The Office of the Ombudsman
Section 11 of the Komesina o Sulufaiga (Ombudsman) Act 1988 establishes the Office of the Ombudsman as an independent body authorised to investigate complaints concerning the actions of governmental authorities within the public sector.

In Samoa's 2011 Universal Periodic Review (UPR), the Samoa Umbrella for Non-Governmental Organisations (SUNGO) was concerned that the office lacked accessibility due to minimal public awareness of the office's functions and its limitation to the public sector.

The current Ombudsman is Luamanuvao Katalaina Sapolu.

National human rights mechanisms
While Samoa has no overarching human rights legislation or institution, there has been movement towards the creation of a Human Rights Commission (HRC).
In 2009, a joint ‘Samoa Declaration’ was agreed upon amongst several Pacific island states. The declaration emphasised the importance of national human rights institutions and encouraged states to establish such bodies.
Samoa has undertaken a Law and Justice Sector Plan 2008-2012 which is intended to include the establishment of a HRC. Samoa reiterated its intention to do so in the UPR in 2011 and received recommendations that it initially be established within the Office of the Ombudsman. In 2013, the Parliament of Samoa passed the Ombudsman (Komesina O Sulufaiga) Act to include human rights as part of the functions of the existing Ombudsman.

Political participation

Electoral system
Universal suffrage was achieved in 1991 for all Samoan citizens aged 21 years and over.

Samoan tradition is incorporated into the electoral system. Through consensus, a single person is nominated as the chief (Maitai) of each village and only those with a chieftain title may then stand for election of the 47 Samoan seats. Two seats are reserved for non-Samoans.

SUNGO has recommended that the electoral system be altered so as to allow any citizen to stand for election rather than restricting to only those nominated by the village.

Women's rights in politics 
The level of female participation in Samoa politics is ranked as one of the world's lowest. Women's right to vote granted through the inception of universal suffrage in 1991 did little to improve women's participation as the prerequisite to become a candidate in Parliament is being a Matai (chiefs) and most matais are men. Therefore, political participation has been a very slow process because women are constantly confronted with challenges and barriers created by traditions, social perceptions, lack of education, measures, policy interventions and much more. To address gender inequality and encourage women's rights in politics, interventions, advocate groups, legislation and treaties have been established. These include the Ministry of Women, Community and Social Development, Convention on the Elimination of all forms of Discrimination Against Women (CEDAW) and the Constitution Amendment Act (2013).

Right to vote 
Since Samoa's independence in 1962, only matais (chiefs) were granted voting rights for various elections at both national and local level. Universal suffrage was introduced in 1991 which granted both women and men aged 21 years and over with voting rights. This was first executed in the 1991 elections.

Political participation 
An issue exists in regards to the under-representation of women in Parliament. Although there are no legal barriers at the national level, in practice women rarely obtain chief titles. Following the general election of 2006, four women became members of the 49-member Parliament. This represented 8.1% of the available seats. This low representation is thought to be influenced by socio-cultural attitudes. Some villages do not allow women to possess chieftain titles, while others such as Malie, Letogo, Tanugamanono and Saleimoa restrict female chieftain by prohibiting their participation in village councils. This reduces their ability to obtain village consensus for their candidacy.

Despite the inception of universal suffrage, women's representation in the political realm in both local and national levels remain marginalized by chiefs in political decision-making processes. The Electoral Act of 1963 imposes that only a matai is eligible to run or serve as a Member of Parliament. In which case a large majority of matais are men. This limited number of women matais hinders the opportunity for women to participate in politics. However, despite male domination of chief titles, women matai numbers in 1993 were reported as 1,261 which was considered to be an improvement from earlier years.

Local level 
Male matais dominate most of the decision-making in village councils. A limited number of female matais are a part of the village councils and women are gradually entering the village councils. There are 240 villages in Samoa with an average of 56 matais per village. Pulenu'u (village mayors) are elected by the village councils and are remunerated by the government. In 2011, five pulenu'u were women which equated 3 per cent of the total pulenu'u population.

As for women in village councils, one woman out of 229 village council members was recorded in 1994. In 2011, an overall 10.5 per cent of chiefs were women and in the village councils, women made up the 36 per cent. Findings from research on women's participation in politics found that a low participation of women at the local level translates into the low population in national government.

National level 
Early evidence of women's representation in Parliament began in 1970 (see table below). Honorable Taulapapa Faimaala was the first woman Member of Parliament (MP) in Samoa and served two terms. She was a pioneer for Samoan women as she was also the first Deputy Speaker of the House in 1973 until 1976. Ten years later, her daughter Honorable Fiame Naomi Mata'afa was elected as an MP and is the longest standing woman in Parliament serving 30 years. In 1998, Fiame became the first female Cabinet Minister who has served as the Minister for Education, Women, Community and Social Development. At present, Fiame is the Minister of Justice and Courts Administration.

Over the years there has been a notable increase of female candidates.There were 22 candidates in 1996 where 3 women were selected as cabinet members. Most recently in March 2016 elections, a record breaking total of 24 candidates came forward in which 4 were elected. In adherence to the 10 per cent quota codified in the Constitutional Amendment Act 2013, an additional woman will be added to Parliament due to the results of the elections.

The following table indicates that despite the relatively low number of female matais, some women have been successful in national politics.

Limitations 
Many academics have attempted to investigate the challenges women face entering politics at all levels. These include cultural and circumstantial barriers and lack of policy interventions which have been reported to bring hindrance to women obtaining support from the villages, traditional leadership knowledge, mentor assistance and political networking.
 Cultural barriers about a women's place in political spheres in both community and Parliament level are one of the major factors influencing women participation and public life. Their primary traditional role was restricted to enhance and uphold family status. The historic methods of upholding their customary role was through producing the ie toga (fine mats) which were the most valuable currency in Samoan social, economic and political sphere. More so, women are referred to as "o le pae ma le auli" or the shell and the iron referring to their role as peacemakers who resolve conflicts within their family which is still evident today. The traditional female roles and responsibilities to spouses and children were stated as barriers for many women to participate in politics.
 Social perceptions of villages in Samoa view women as supporters, organizers and campaign managers for their spouse or male relatives who are decision makers or political candidates.
 A need of education and training measures to challenge social attitudes about women and decision making are necessary remedies to assist women's perspectives. There is a lack of educational opportunities to help promote young women attitudes and self-belief as potential leaders or to introduce them to the concept of national politics. Women who are not exposed to the matai language and protocols during their upbringing will play a vital role into future roles in politics. In turn, does not provide women with the right resources and preparations to be involved in decision-making in matai council meetings. Such knowledge and meaningful contribution to village rules and governance acquires mentorship and education from active women politicians.
 A lack of policy to initiate positive change to the low numbers of female participation was stated by UNICEF as a fundamental contributing factor.

Promoting women's representation 
Ratification of certain treaties, legislation and establishment of a Ministry for Women are among many efforts that Samoa has taken to promote women roles and rights in politics.

Ministry of Women, Community and Social Development 
The Samoan government established the Ministry of Women's Affairs now referred to as the Ministry of Women, Community and Social Development (MWCSD). Its purpose according to the Ministry of Women's Affairs Amendment Act 1998 was to empower women to fulfill their role in society and in the workplace. A division of women has been established under the governance of MWCSD, to act as the "focal point" for the CEDAW that works in partnership with NGOs and other government departments.

Convention on the Elimination of all forms of Discrimination Against Women (CEDAW) 
In September 1991, Samoa ratified the Convention on the Elimination of all forms of Discrimination Against Women (CEDAW) to provide a human rights framework based on gender equality. Samoa was the first Pacific Island Country to become a party to CEDAW. In execution of Samoa's commitment to CEDAW, it must submit a report on the legislative, judicial, administration or other measures which it has adapted to give effect to CEDAW. According to UNICEF, members and leaders of judicial, legal, management and community in Samoa society must understand CEDAW to better implement and adhere to this convention.

Relevant to women participation in politics, Article 7 of CEDAW imposes governments to grant women with the right to vote, participate in forming and implementing government policies and to join public and political organisations.

Constitution Amendment Act (2013) 
In June 2013, in response to recommendations for policy interventions to address gender imbalance, the Samoan government ratified the Constitution Amendment Act (2013) (CAA). It established a 10 per cent quota system to reserve seats to women electoral candidates into the national legislative assembly. It guarantees women representation if there is less than five seats elected, up to five seats will be reserved for women and if there are only two, then the three women with the next highest number of votes will be granted seats. In adaptation of such constitutional mandate for female Parliamentarian seats, Samoa has become the first independent country in the Pacific to do so. The Prime Minister Honorable Tuilaepa Aiono Sailele Malielegaoi announced the Parliament's intention when seeking to implement the legislation:"If we do not put in the necessary stipulation in our legislation one never knows whether in the next elections there [will] be absolutely no women in Parliament. So this is part of our intention to ensure that there shall always be women in Parliament."The reception of the amendment has been both negative and positive. On the one hand, the amendment demonstrates a positive change for Samoa as it will improve women participation in Parliament. The Speaker of the Legislative Assembly referred to it as 'a new dawn for women'''. However at the preliminary discussions before passing of the Bill, the opposition party Tautua Samoa contended that there was a need to gather a consensus and views from the villages because some villages have banned women from holding matai titles. The quota was described as being 'minimal' and 'not enough' to make a real difference. In response to the amendment, an interview with an MP before March 2016 elections stated that Samoan government are not actively executing their duty to address women's representation in politics despite their wish to do so. Another view argued that although the amendment is a good start to counter political involvement, intervention is more needed to address cultural and tangible barriers to women as political leaders.

In adherence to the new law, the results of the March 2016 elections activated 10 per cent quota system. Four candidates were elected and as such a fifth female candidate will be added to Parliament using the highest votes percentage ratio as required by the amendment.

Women's Rights 
Domestic violence
Domestic violence against women remains a prominent issue in Samoa as recognised by its government and CEDAW. The Crimes Act 2013 criminalizes rape, including marital rape.

Accurate statistics are difficult to obtain as often cases are not reported or recorded due to societal attitudes that discourage this. Altering such perspectives is identified as important in combating this problem. However, there has been a rise in the number of cases reported in recent years. This increase has been attributed to governmental departments and non-governmental organisations (NGO's) in implementing programmes that have created greater awareness of the issue and encouraged reporting.

Samoa has established measures to aid in combating this problem such as:
A National Plan of Action for the Advancement of Women (2008–2012) which outlines a strategic approach for the advancement of women's rights.
The Ministry of Women, Community and Social Development (MWCSD) whose mandate focuses on the social and economic development of the community with an emphasis on the role of women. The ministry also undertakes awareness programmes on issues of domestic abuse.
The finalisation of the Family Safety Bill 2009 is intended to give greater effect to CEDAW and CRC in relation to domestic violence issues. The enactment of the bill has been criticised as taking too long.
The Domestic Violence Unit operates within the Ministry of Police and Prisons and handles issues of violence against women and children.

Employment rights
While women enjoy many of the same rights as men in terms of employment opportunities, there remain areas of discrimination. In 2007 it was reported that under national legislation women were restricted from undertaking night time work or manual labour that is deemed ‘unsuited to their physical capacity.’ This has been seen as inconsistent with article 11 of CEDAW which prohibits discrimination in employment.

Abortion

Abortion is only legal in Samoa if the mother's life or physical or mental health is at risk.

Prison conditions
The prison conditions in Samoa, most notably the main prison at Tafaigata'', are of low quality and the Samoan government has recognised the need to remedy the situation. Prison facilities lack sufficient resources in regards to funding and the availability of trained personnel. SUNGO reported that a number of prisons failed to adequately provide a sufficient quantity of basic necessities such as water, food and basic sanitation. It has been noted that prison cells are holding large groups of prisoners beyond their capabilities.

While the Office of the Ombudsman is authorised to receive complaints from prisoners, this avenue has not yet been utilised. Under the Law and Justice Sector Plan, the government is reviewing the Prison Act 1967 and drafting legislation to move responsibility for the review of prisons away from the Ministry of Police and establish it within an independent authority.

Freedom of Religion
Article 11 of the Constitution of Samoa guarantees Freedom of Religion. The preamble to the 1960 Constitution enunciates Samoa as “an independent State based on Christian principles and Samoan custom and traditions”. The major issues concerning freedom of religion throughout the years gave rise to international criticism and international media coverage as well as legal battles. These issues stem from the inconsistencies in theory, including a clear definition of what religious freedom is, the interpretation of Article 11 and practices in the local level in villages.

Background and social structure
Prior to its independence in 1962, Samoa underwent a lot of struggle through civil wars and the arrival of colonial powers in the 18th century further exacerbated the problem of tribal rivalry. This was because the rivalry between the colonists forced the indigenous groups to take sides creating further conflict between the indigenous people. Colonisation came in the form of missionaries and traders in the 1830s and the arrival of the missionaries brought Christianity. However, it also generated change to Samoa not only of its traditional beliefs but also its world viewpoint. Colonisation, eurocentrism and Christianity influenced Samoa tremendously; through westernisation of systems but also overtime; the erosion of traditional beliefs replaced by modernised Christian concept as well as corruption of thought. The quick succession and acceptance of Christianity concomitant with the fulfilment of the prophecy of the legendary warrior goddess Nafanua. “…foretelling that chief Malietoa would gain power from heaven”. Religion quickly became the core of Samoan life and the cornerstone of the villages. The three main denominations in Samoa are Congregational Christian Church, Methodist and Catholic since these were the first three arrived in Samoa, therefore the villages have a sense of loyalty to these three denominations giving rise to their dominance. Church ministers gain the highest prestige and in most villages; acquire the elite equivalent to the highest chief, with the villagers’ conviction that the true blessings from God is through subservient to the church. Almost all Samoans identify themselves as Christians. A Parliamentary Democracy with its legal system based on English Common law, Samoa was admitted to the United Nations in 1976. Samoa is made up of villages and each village has its own bylaws. These bylaws include which religion the village would accept for villagers to worship. This has been the traditional political system enshrined in their culture for 3,000 years and still practised today. The village system comprises the ‘fono a matai’, or ‘fono a ali’i ma faipule’ the matai council literally meaning ‘the council of titled men’; the ‘fono a matai’ underpins Samoan culture. This council is seen as the law in the villages making the fono the most powerful system in Samoa. They are responsible for making bylaws in which all the villagers abide, regulating the bylaws and rules and setting standardised penalties for violations of village bylaws. Communalism is deeply rooted in village life hence the fono is also accountable for peace and harmony of the village. The fono is governed under the “Village Fono Act 1990”.

Freedom of Religion Versus Village Fono
The Constitution of Samoa Article 11 guarantees protection of freedom of religion. However, it has been under scrutiny with much heated debates for years, in its application versus the village fono bylaws. Although these rights are guaranteed; time and time again, violations of these rights are a norm in the local level with most incidents gone unreported; perhaps out of fear of reparations if they oppose the fono openly, or, the value of va-fealoa’i (relationships based on respect of age, gender, status) and so conformity and compliance out of respect for the fono is the usual individual response to rights violations. This is because almost all villages have agreed to the mainline denominations (CCC, Methodist, Catholic) to be the only denominations for the villagers to attend. In the village of Gataivai in Savai’i (Samoa's biggest island), Methodist is the only denomination allowed whereas in Satupa’itea in Savai’i also where Catholic is the only denomination permitted. But, in the cases that have made the media limelight, for example the village of Salamumu; where a new denomination was banned from holding bible studies in the village as Methodist is the only denomination allowed; four men of an evangelic church were hog-tied; carried to the public road and left there until rescued by a church minister who pleaded for the men's lives. The new church members’ houses were burnt by the village, their possession destroyed and members beaten including a pregnant woman. In the case of Sovita v Police, the defendants were chiefs and untitled men (taulele’a) of Salamumu village; who argued that they were acting on order and command from the decision made by the fono. The case of Mau Sefo & others v Attorney General, the village of Saipipi banished the plaintiffs from the village for executing bible studies and worship services other than the three (mainline denominations) sanctioned. Furthermore, in the case of Tariu Tuivaiti v Sila Faamalaga & Others, “the plaintiffs were banished from the village of Matautu Falelatai for failing to attend church”. While the Courts are ruling in favour of fundamental rights including freedom of religion under the Constitution, only a few cases make it to court.

There are a number of reasons why people refrain from seeking legal remedies or advice. It is clear that at the village fono and on the local level, article 11 of the Constitution is hardly appreciated. The aforementioned issues between Christian denominations raises questions of “How religious are Samoans?” and “what Christian principles practised?” as Samoa claim to be a religious nation and these problems contradict the Constitution; of “Samoa is founded on God based on Christian principles and Samoan custom and tradition”. The survey by Angelica Saada titled ‘Samoa: A truly Religious Place? Views Towards Religion in Samoa’, is an endeavour to provide answers to a conflicting Constitution. The lawsuits and village bylaws prove that the individual rights are indeed unprotected. There is an immense gap between the Constitution and the village bylaws. The media also must be commended, because they bring these delicate issues into the public sphere. In the most publicized Salamumu 1998 incident opened discussions, and, the response to the citizens outcry and international denunciation sparked the Cabinet to set up a Commission of Inquiry in 2010 “…to inquire and report on the working of Article 11 of the Constitution of the Independent State of Samoa in relation to the right to freedom of religion”,. Nevertheless, critics must not shift the blame to the village fono, as the key to understanding is education. This is where the government is lacking. It is well enough to have guarantee on the protection of fundamental rights, but understanding on application of these rights on the local level have never been clear. It is the government's responsibility therefore to provide and facilitate discussion and education for the villages on how these rights can be protected and how they can be enhanced by the fono. Bryan Zoe, in her study on “Prosecution of Religious Minorities in Samoa: The Baha’i Struggle to Face a Common Problem”, provide a lot of insight into gaining understanding of the different beliefs and education in other religions other than Christianity. Imam Mohammed Yahya also suggests the importance of gaining knowledge into other faiths will create greater understanding. Dr Bin Yahya also said that ‘the only Christian church to invite him to talk about Islam was the Methodist Theological College’.

Samoa’s constitutional amendment and its international obligations
There is another dangerous issue lurking in Samoa's Constitution. In December 2016, a bill to amend the Constitution was introduced to Parliament and in 2017, the Constitutional Amendment passed. In the preamble, religious freedom was open to interpretation whereas the Constitutional Amendment now is more specific; and enshrined into law. It is now definite to: “Samoa is founded on God the Father, the Son, and the Holy Spirit”. While village bylaws are now more lenient to religious freedom of Christian individuals; due to a lot of negative publicity and criticism, they are still intolerant to religious freedom of minority non-Christian beliefs. The Constitution Amendment further suppress religious freedom of these communities. In the 2013 Samoa International Religious Freedom Report, it is clear that the vast majority of Samoa are unwilling to accept non-Christian beliefs let alone their religious freedom. Section 3 of the same report states; "Prominent societal leaders repeatedly emphasized in public that the country was Christian. Public discussion of religious issues sometimes included negative references to non-Christian religions". Although there are limitations to the freedom, there has never been any issues or conflicts from the non-Christian community like the Baha’i Faith and Islam; that would pose any threats to Christians in Samoa. Their principles in particular the Baha’i Faith, consist of universal peace, oneness, equality, the abolitions of religious, racial, political and patriotic prejudice; to name a few. These are the true attributes and values towards peace and harmony in any society. What is more critical is the role of the Samoan National Council of Churches as they put a lot of pressure on the government to ban non-Christian beliefs.

Furthermore, the Samoa parliament is a one-party government and even more contradictory is the religious freedom issue and the mandate of the reigning party; the Human Rights Protection Party (HRPP). The new amendment not only threatens the core principles of democracy, it allows violation of religious freedom of non-Christian communities, a breach of International Covenant on Civil and Political Rights (ICCPR) in which Samoa acceded in 2008. Also, under democracy, wouldn't something so significant like amendment to a constitution be done through a citizens referendum? Part XI, General and Miscellaneous provision, Article 109(1) of the Samoa Constitutional, states: (1) “Any of the provisions of this Constitution may be amended or repealed by Act, and new provisions may be inserted in this Constitution by Act, if a bill for any such purpose is supported at its third reading by the votes of not less than two-thirds of the total Members of Parliament…”, this provision legitimises the Parliaments actions but further violates the citizens political rights. What is more concerning is there is no opposition party and so any Acts of Parliament would not be voted against unless it is a conscious vote. A Constitution amendment without a citizens' referendum is justifiable under the above provision. Religious freedom for the non-Christian minorities are not guaranteed under the New Constitution Amendment. Christians have the new amended Constitution to support and protect them (hence the National Council of Churches are calling to ban Islam from Samoa); whereas non-Christians will be challenged in courts. Imam Mohammed Bin Yahya raised another valid question: “Will the new amendment jeopardise Samoa’s relationships and aid from non-Christian countries like China and Japan?” Meanwhile, despite the Prime Minister saying that the amendment “would unlikely touch Article 11”, there is an international outcry and calls from scholars in Samoa and abroad with concern over the Samoa Constitution Amendment. In the Samoa Observer editorial 30/2/2016, Gatoaitele Savea Sano Malifa stated that “The aim of Prime Minister Tuilaepa’s Constitution Amendment is to declare the dominance of Christianity in Samoa”. Therefore, religious freedom of non-Christian minorities faces uncertainty under the amended Constitution and it appears that violation of fundamental human rights like freedom of religion will soon be lawful in Samoa.

Disabled persons
Based on statistics from 2006, there are approximately 2100 persons living with disabilities in Samoa. There is no specific legislation protecting the rights of persons with disabilities and nor is it a basis for freedom from discrimination in Samoa's constitution. Samoa is not a party to the Convention on the Rights of Persons with Disabilities (CRPD) yet has indicated that they would consider acceding to it.

Samoa has set up a National Disabilities Taskforce which constructs programmes that provide assistance to persons with disabilities. This is guided by the National Policy and National Plan of Action for Persons with Disabilities set up in 2009.

Rights of the child
The issue of child street vendors in Samoa has been acknowledged with growing concern. SUNGO submits that by allowing this issue to continue, Samoa is acting contrary its obligations under both the CRC in regards to the right to education and the convention of the ILO in regards to freedom from exploitative labour.

Reports suggest that issues of poverty and hardship contribute to the existence of child street vendors. Samoa has a National Policy for Children 2010-2015 which is aimed at alleviating poverty and providing protection to children through programmes and services.

See also
 Censorship in Samoa
 LGBT rights in Samoa
 Universal Declaration of Human Rights, Article 2
 Village Fono Act 1990
 United Nations General Assembly, 2016, Elimination of all forms of religious intolerance
 United Nations General Assembly, 1999, Elimination of all forms of religious intolerance
 International Convention on Civil and Political Rights Article 2(1), Article 3, Article 18(2), Article 18(3)
 Carolyn Evans, Religion as Politics not Law: the Religion Clauses in the Australian Constitution

References

External links
 Converging Currents: Custom and Human Rights in the Pacific (NZLC 2006)
 2010 Human Rights Reports: Samoa (US State Department)
 Millennium Development Goals, Samoa’s Second Progress Report, 2010
 The Constitution of the Independent State of Samoa
 Universal Periodic Review: Report of the Working Group on the Universal Periodic Review: Samoa 2011
 Convention on the Elimination of All Forms of Discrimination against Women (CEDAW)
 Election results of 2016
 Ministry of Women Community and Social Development website
 Parliament of Samoa website
 Constitution of Western Samoa 1960
The Constitution of the Independent State of Western Samoa 1990

 
Samoa